Kerry LaiFatt (born 1979) is a Canadian actress.

LaiFatt was born in Burlington, Ontario, but lived in Jamaica for the first four years of her life. Kerry attended Ryerson University in Toronto specializing in Fashion Design.

Career
LaiFatt was the host of All X-Treme (Global Television) and  Inner City Soul (Firewatch Films) in 2003. Her television credits include Mutant X, Relic Hunter, Falcon Beach, The Dresden Files and Living in Your Car. Her most notable roles are Phoenix on Metropia and Julie Cordry on Paradise Falls.

References

External links

Metropia cast bio:Kerry LaiFatt 
Paradise Falls Cast Bio Kerry Lai Fatt

1979 births
Living people
Actresses from Ontario
Canadian television actresses
People from Burlington, Ontario